Halvor Næs (19 April 1928 – 13 October 2022) was a Norwegian ski jumper who competed in the 1950s. His only victory was in 1953 and he finished fifth in the individual large hill event at the 1952 Winter Olympics in Oslo. He was born in Trysil. Næs was awarded the Holmenkollen medal in 1964 (shared with Veikko Kankkonen, Eero Mäntyranta, and Georg Thoma). Næs died in Trysil on 13 October 2022, at the age of 94.

References

Sources

Holmenkollen medalists - click Holmenkollmedaljen for downloadable pdf file 

1928 births
2022 deaths
Ski jumpers at the 1952 Winter Olympics
Ski jumpers at the 1960 Winter Olympics
Holmenkollen medalists
Norwegian male ski jumpers
Olympic ski jumpers of Norway
People from Trysil
Sportspeople from Innlandet
20th-century Norwegian people